Hungary competed at the 2022 World Games held in Birmingham, United States from 7 to 17 July 2022.  Athletes representing Hungary won 11 gold medals, seven silver medals and nine bronze medals. The country finished in 6th place in the medal table.

Medalists

Competitors
The following is the list of number of competitors in the Games.

Aerobic gymnastics

Hungary won four medals in aerobic gymnastics.

Air sports

Hungary competed in air sports and drone racing.

Archery

Hungary competed in archery.

Canoe marathon

Hungary won three medals in canoe marathon.

Dancesport

Hungary competed in dancesport.

Finswimming

Hungary won 11 medals in finswimming.

Ju-jitsu

Hungary competed in ju-jitsu.

Karate

Hungary won one silver medal in karate.

Men

Kickboxing

Hungary competed in kickboxing.

Lifesaving

Hungary won four medals in lifesaving.

Muaythai

Hungary won two bronze medals in muaythai.

Orienteering

Hungary competed in orienteering.

Rhythmic gymnastics

Hungary won two bronze medals in rhythmic gymnastics.

Road speed skating

Hungary competed in road speed skating.

Squash

Hungary competed in squash.

Sumo

Hungary competed in sumo.

Track speed skating

Hungary competed in track speed skating.

Notes

References

Nations at the 2022 World Games
2022
World Games